Sir John Edward Singleton (18 January 1885 – 6 January 1957) was a British politician and judge.

Early life and career 
Singleton was born in St Michael's on Wyre, Lancashire, and was educated at Lancaster Royal Grammar School and Pembroke College, Cambridge, where he read Law, obtaining a third-class degree. He was called to the bar at the Inner Temple in 1906, and joined the Northern Circuit. During World War I he served in the Royal Field Artillery, achieving the rank of captain. He was also mentioned in dispatches. He became a King's Counsel in 1922.

In the 1922 general election, he was elected to the House of Commons for Lancaster as a Conservative, but was unseated in the 1923 general election by the Liberal candidate. After his defeat, he returned to the bar; he was Judge of Appeal in the Isle of Man between 1928 and 1932, and Recorder of Preston between 1928 and 1934.

Judicial career 
Singleton was appointed a judge of the King's Bench Division of the High Court in 1934, receiving the customary knighthood. In 1936, he presided over the murder trial of Buck Ruxton at the Manchester Assizes. During World War II, he was asked by the Cabinet to report on the effectiveness of the Royal Air Force's strategic bombing campaign.

In 1946, he served as the British chairman of the Anglo-American Committee of Inquiry on Mandatory Palestine. Richard Crossman, who also served on the Committee, described Singleton as being 'intensely loyal to what he conceived to be the interests of the [British] government'. An anti-Zionist, Singleton favoured the disarming of the Hagenah and the curtailment of the functions of the Jewish Agency.

In 1948, Singleton was appointed a Lord Justice of Appeal, and was sworn into the Privy Council. He served on the Court of Appeal until his death in 1957.

Decisions 
 Hartog v Colin & Shields [1939] 3 All ER 566

References

External links 
 
 

1885 births
1957 deaths
UK MPs 1922–1923
Conservative Party (UK) MPs for English constituencies
Lords Justices of Appeal
Members of the Privy Council of the United Kingdom
English King's Counsel
Alumni of Pembroke College, Cambridge
Knights Bachelor
Members of the Inner Temple
Queen's Bench Division judges
20th-century English lawyers